Flinn Township is a former township in Lawrence County, Indiana, United States. The township was dissolved on January 1, 1911.

History
Flinn Township was named after a local family, who settled near the Leesville area in February 1810. The township lasted slightly less than a century, when the board of county commissioners voted to dissolve the township in December 1910. This went into effect on January 1, 1911, and the township was annexed by Shawswick, Guthrie, and Pleasant Run Townships.

Municipality

Unincorporated community
 Leesville at

Demographics

References

Lawrence County, Indiana